Bolesworth Castle is a country house  south of the village of Tattenhall, Cheshire, England.  It is recorded in the National Heritage List for England as a designated Grade II* listed building.

History
Bolesworth Castle was built for George Walmesley, a Manchester businessman, to a design by William Cole in 1829, on the site of an older house dating from 1750.  In 1856 it was bought by Robert Barbour, a Scottish businessman who founded a cotton textile business in Manchester. It has remained in the Barbour family since.  In 1920–23 the castle was partly remodelled by Clough Williams-Ellis.

Architecture

The house is built in ashlar sandstone and is castellated.  It is mainly in two storeys with wide canted bays in the centre and on the right, and a wide round bay on the left.  At the centre, and recessed, is a three-story tower with turrets.

Around the house and in the grounds are a number of structures which are listed Grade II.  These are the wall and steps of the upper and middle terraces, the wall of the lower terrace, a temple with a statue of Diana, the park gates, gate piers and wing walls on the north drive, gate piers on the drive from Chowley Lodge, an open shelter, a bridge over the fishpool, and a boat house.

Recent history and present day

He developed the estate as a centre for small businesses, restoring redundant buildings and modernising its 16 farms, thereby supporting some 800 jobs. Barbour also replanted the garden with over 350 varieties of trees. In 1998 he was awarded the Bledisloe gold medal by the Royal Agricultural Society of England for the work he did on the estate. Barbour died in 2007. Since then the estate has been cared for by his wife, Diana, and by his daughter, Nina, who is the director of the estate. Nina also organises the annual Bolesworth International show jumping event in the grounds.

See also

Grade II* listed buildings in Cheshire West and Chester
Listed buildings in Broxton, Cheshire

References

External links
Bolesworth Estate
Bolesworth International

Country houses in Cheshire
Grade II* listed buildings in Cheshire
Houses completed in 1829
Buildings and structures completed in 1923
Castles in Cheshire
Grade II* listed houses